The Devil Plays is a 1931 American pre-Code mystery film directed by Richard Thorpe and starring Jameson Thomas, Florence Britton and Thomas E. Jackson. It was given a British release under the alternative title of The Murdock Affair.

Cast
 Jameson Thomas as Harry Forrest  
 Florence Britton as Diana Amberson  
 Thomas E. Jackson as Inspector Brown  
 Dorothy Christy as Dolores Quincy  
 Richard Tucker as Gerald Murdock  
 Lillian Rich as Grace Stiles  
 Robert Ellis as Stiles  
 Lew Kelly as Snyder  
 Carmelita Geraghty as Rita Kane  
 Edmund Burns as Dick Quincy 
 Murdock MacQuarrie as Butler  
 Jack Trent as Duncan

References

Bibliography
 Monaco, James. The Encyclopedia of Film. Perigee Books, 1991.

External links
 

1931 films
1931 mystery films
1930s English-language films
American mystery films
Films directed by Richard Thorpe
Chesterfield Pictures films
American black-and-white films
1930s American films